Andrea de Rossi, C.R. (15 July 1644 – 30 October 1696) was a Roman Catholic prelate who served as Archbishop of Rossano (1688–1696).

Biography
Andrea de Rossi was born in Serre, Campania and ordained a priest in the Congregation of Clerics Regular of the Divine Providence. On 31 May 1688, he was appointed during the papacy of Pope Innocent XI as Archbishop of Rossano. On 8 June 1688, he was consecrated bishop by Galeazzo Marescotti, Cardinal-Priest of Santi Quirico e Giulitta, with Pietro de Torres, Archbishop of Dubrovnik, and Pier Antonio Capobianco, Bishop Emeritus of Lacedonia, serving as co-consecrators. He served as Archbishop of Rossano until his death on 30 October 1696.

References

External links and additional sources
 (for Chronology of Bishops)
 (for Chronology of Bishops)

17th-century Italian Roman Catholic archbishops
Bishops appointed by Pope Innocent XI
1644 births
1696 deaths
Clerics regular
Theatine bishops
People from the Province of Salerno